The 2012 Buffalo Bills season was the franchise's 43rd season in the National Football League, the 53rd overall and the third under head coach Chan Gailey. The team had hoped to make the playoffs for the first time since 1999, but failed and continue to own the NFL's longest playoff drought.

2012 was the final year on the Bills' current lease with Ralph Wilson Stadium as well as the final year on the current Bills Toronto Series agreement. The league had approved an additional five-year extension of the Toronto series, extending through 2017, on the condition that the Bills and Rogers Communications come to an agreement extending the series, a condition that both sides have indicated willingness to do. The Bills and the league are demanding significant and expensive renovations to Ralph Wilson Stadium as a condition of renewing the stadium lease. The Buffalo News reported renovations could top 200 million dollars.  The Bills and Erie County (the owners of Ralph Wilson Stadium) missed the deadline for a long-term agreement in September 2012. However, on December 21, the Bills agreed with Erie County to a 10-year lease on Ralph Wilson Stadium, extending it through for at least another 7 years.

Personnel changes
On January 2, 2012, one day after the conclusion of the season, George Edwards was fired from his position as defensive coordinator. Edwards had been the defensive coordinator for the 2010 and 2011 seasons. Former NFL and college head coach Dave Wannstedt was promoted to defensive coordinator. (Bills head coach Chan Gailey had been the offensive coordinator under Wannstedt in 2000 and 2001, when Wannstedt was Miami's head coach.)

Roster changes

In his annual season-ending press conference, general manager Buddy Nix laid out his priorities for the offseason. Nix stated that the team was eager to re-sign wide receiver Stevie Johnson, kicker Rian Lindell and offensive tackle Demetress Bell. Johnson and Lindell were successfully re-signed; Bell was signed by Philadelphia. He also stated that he wanted to re-sign running back Fred Jackson and have him retire as a Bill. Jackson whose contract ran through the end of the 2012 season was having a career season before a mid season 2011 injury. Johnson renewed his contract with the Bills for five years and $36.2 million on March 5, 2012.

On March 15, 2012, the Bills made the biggest free agent acquisition in team history, signing all-pro defensive end Mario Williams to a contract worth $100 million over six years, with $50 million guaranteed, the largest contract for a defensive player in NFL history.  The recruiting of Williams took place over three days, starting with general manager Buddy Nix and defensive coordinator Dave Wannstedt escorting Williams to Buffalo in a private jet. Bills Hall of Fame quarterback Jim Kelly was also part of the recruiting.

On March 21, 2012 Mark Anderson, who had 12.5 sacks with the Patriots over the 2011 regular season and playoffs, signed a four-year deal with Buffalo. With announced plans to switch to the 4–3 defense the Bills could field Mario Williams at left end and Anderson on the opposite side in passing situations. Kyle Williams and Marcell Dareus will anchor the middle of the defensive line.

On May 11, 2012 the Bills made yet another high-profile signing by signing QB Vince Young to a one-year contract to back up Ryan Fitzpatrick. Young was the 3rd overall pick in the 2006 NFL Draft. He was nonetheless released in the middle of the preseason, with Gailey citing inconsistency as the reason, and replaced by Tarvaris Jackson, whom the Bills acquired in a trade with the Seattle Seahawks. Because Jackson was not ready for the start of the regular season, the Bills will go with four quarterbacks on its roster for the first several weeks of the season.

Kickoff specialist John Potter, a rookie, made the 53-man roster. He will specialize in kickoffs to ease pressure on the team's aging kickers, placekicker Rian Lindell and punter Brian Moorman, who handled the duties in the past. (Moorman would be released from the roster three weeks into the regular season.)

2012 Draft

Notes
 The team acquired an additional fourth-round selection (#124 overall) in a trade that sent wide receiver Lee Evans to the Baltimore Ravens.
 The team acquired an additional fifth-round selection (#147 overall) as part of a trade that sent running back Marshawn Lynch to the Seattle Seahawks.
 Compensatory selection.

Undrafted free agents
Stanford safety Delano Howell, Missouri State running back Chris Douglas, Virginia Tech cornerback Cris Hill, Colorado State offensive lineman Paul Madsen, Florida State punter Shawn Powell, Texas offensive lineman David Snow, Penn State safety Nick Sukay, Mercyhurst safety/long snapper Ian Wild, Texas A&M linebacker Garrick Williams and Richmond quarterback Aaron Corp. Corp was later released.

Staff

Final roster

Schedule

Preseason

Regular season

Note: Intra-division opponents are in bold text.
 #  Indicates the game was part of the Bills Toronto Series.

Game summaries

Week 1: at New York Jets

Week 2: vs. Kansas City Chiefs

Week 3: at Cleveland Browns

Week 4: vs. New England Patriots

Week 5: at San Francisco 49ers

Week 6: at Arizona Cardinals

Week 7: vs. Tennessee Titans

Week 9: at Houston Texans

Week 10: at New England Patriots

With the loss, the Bills dropped to 3–6 and 0–11 against the Patriots at Gillette Stadium.

Week 11: vs. Miami Dolphins

By beating the Dolphins on a Thursday Night Football showdown, Buffalo improved to 4–6 and snapped an 8-game losing skid against division rivals.

Week 12: at Indianapolis Colts

Week 13: vs. Jacksonville Jaguars

Week 14: vs. St. Louis Rams

Week 15: vs. Seattle Seahawks
Bills Toronto Series

With the loss, the Bills fall to 5–9 and are officially eliminated from postseason contention.

Week 16: at Miami Dolphins

Week 17: vs. New York Jets

Standings

Statistics

Team leaders

 stats values are correct through Week 14. '

League rankings
Total Offense (YPG): 346.4 (17th)
Passing (YPG): 199 (26th)
Rushing (YPG): 147.9 (4th)
Total Defense (YPG): 368.5 (24th)
Passing (YPG): 229 (13th)
Rushing (YPG): 139.2 (30th)

Stats correct through week 14.

References

External links
 

Buffalo
Buffalo Bills seasons
Buff